Twila Paris (born December 28, 1958, in Fort Worth, Texas) is a contemporary Christian music singer, songwriter, author and pianist. Since 1980, Paris has released 22 albums, amassed 33 number one Christian Radio singles, and was named the Gospel Music Association Female Vocalist of the Year three years in a row. Many of her earlier songs such as "He Is Exalted", "We Will Glorify", "Lamb of God", and "We Bow Down", are found in church hymnals or otherwise sung in church settings.  She was inducted into the Gospel Music Association Hall of Fame in May 2015.

Career
As a child she released her first album, Little Twila Paris, in 1965. The album included songs drawn from among those she sang with her family in their evangelistic outreaches.

Paris released her first full-length album, Knowin' You're Around, in 1980, and along the way she has written books, recorded children's music, and created worship songs.

In the 1980s and 1990s, Paris released mainly contemporary Christian pop songs. But in recent years, she has focused on recording new versions of some of her worship standards and writing new praise and worship music. Her 2005 album He Is Exalted: Live Worship collects a number of favorite songs commonly used in praise and worship of Paris's and presents them in a more typical style of live worship music. After her song "He Is Exalted" was used in churches in Brazil, Paris re-recorded it in the Portuguese translation they were using. This version appears on her 1992 album Sanctuary. Sanctuary won the GMA Praise & Worship Album of the Year, and in 1995, her song "God Is In Control" won a GMA Song of the Year award. She has won five GMA Dove Awards and three American Songwriter Awards.

Although associated for much of her career with Star Song Communications, EMI switched her to Sparrow Records in 1996, before her contract ended after 2003. In 2005, she switched to the praise and worship label Integrity Music for He Is Exalted: Live Worship.

Paris released Small Sacrifice on December 26, 2007, which was available only through her Web site and at LifeWay Christian Stores. This album married the two parts of her career by including both inspirational pop/adult contemporary songs and original praise and worship compositions. Her first radio single from Small Sacrifice was "Live to Praise". Small Sacrifice was released for wider distribution by Koch Records on February 24, 2009.

In 2012, Paris released a patriotic-themed project called God Shed His Grace: Songs of Truth and Freedom that includes two new cuts ("God of Our Fathers" and "America the Beautiful") and ten cuts that Paris hand-picked from other projects. The purpose of the project is to inspire patriots with themes of God's protection and love, even in difficult times.

From 2011 to 2012, Paris was part of the Christian Classics Tour, joining artists Steve Green, Wayne Watson, Larnelle Harris and Michael Card.

Legacy
Paris has created a body of work in a modern hymn style. Her compositions are included in hymnals used by several Christian denominations and various Charismatic churches. Kelly Willard and Jamie Owens-Collins sang background vocals for her on her Keepin' My Eyes On You album and sang as a trio on the hymn "Leaning on the Everlasting Arms" on The Warrior Is a Child.

Personal life
Twila Paris is the daughter of Oren Paris II, the son of travelling late 19th and early 20th century street preachers and his wife Rachel Inez Paris. In the late 1970s, Oren Paris II founded a Youth with a Mission (YWAM) base in Elm Springs, Arkansas. Oren II is the cousin of YWAM founder, Loren Cunningham.

After Oren II's passing, his son Oren III, claimed his father as the founder and Chancellor of Ecclesia College in Springdale, Arkansas, which operates on the former physical grounds of the Elm Springs YWAM base. In 2017, Twila Paris defended her brother Oren III after he was indicted for participating in a kickback scheme as Ecclesia's president, stating, "Those who know him [Oren III] well know that he is a man of deep integrity with a long established record of exemplary character. It is very clear that his highest aim is always to please God." In September 2018, Oren III received a three-year prison sentence for the kickback scheme.

Twila Paris married her manager Jack Wright in 1985. Paris indicated in an interview that Wright had contracted the Epstein–Barr virus (EBV) causing him chronic fatigue.

Paris and Wright have a son.

Politics 
Paris endorsed Ted Cruz in the 2016 Republican presidential primary, saying that "he is a leader we have been praying for."

Discography

Albums 
1965: Little Twila Paris
1981: Knowin' You're Around
1982: Keepin' My Eyes On You
1984: The Warrior Is a Child
1985: Kingdom Seekers
1987: Same Girl
1988: For Every Heart
1989: It's the Thought... (Christmas album)
1990: Cry for the Desert
1991: Sanctuary 
1993: Beyond a Dream
1995: The Time Is Now (EP)
1996: Where I Stand
1998: Perennial: Songs for the Seasons of Life
1999: True North 
2001: Bedtime Prayers: Lullabies and Peaceful Worship (children's album)
2003: House of Worship
2005: He Is Exalted: Live Worship
2007: Small Sacrifice
2014: Hymns (EP)

Compilations 
1992: A Heart That Knows You
1996: The Early Years (selections from Kingdom Seekers and Same Girl)
2000: Signature Songs 
2001: Greatest Hits: Time & Again 
2004: 8 Great Hits 
2005: Simply 
2006: The Ultimate Collection
2012: God Shed His Grace: Songs of Truth and Freedom (with two new tracks)
2014: 20th Century Masters – The Millennium Collection

Hit singles

Top-ten singles (Adult Contemporary Christian Charts) 
 No. 1 "The Warrior is a Child" (1984-11-02)
 No. 2 "Do I Trust You" (1984-12-26)
 No. 1 "Runner" (1986-04-01)
 No. 2 "Lamb of God" (1986-06-25)
 No. 10 "He is Exalted" (1986-10-20)
 No. 1 "Prince of Peace" (1987-09-07)
 No. 7 "Holy is the Lord" (1987-11-16)
 No. 2 "Bonded Together" (1988-03-21)
 No. 4 "Send Me" (1988-06-13)
 No. 1 "Every Heart That is Breaking" (1988-10-31)
 No. 1 "True Friend" (1989-02-06)
 No. 3 "Never Ending Love" (1989-05-15)
 No. 1 "Sweet Victory" (1989-09-04)
 No. 1 "I See You Standing" (1990-09-17)
 No. 6 "How Beautiful" (1991-01-07)
 No. 7 "Cry For the Desert" (1991-03-18)
 No. 1 "Nothing But Love" (1991-07-22)
 No. 7 "Undivided Heart" (1991-10-14)
 No. 1 "The Joy of the Lord" (1992-02-10)
 No. 1 "I'm Still Here" (with Bruce Carroll) (1992-05-25)
 No. 1 "Destiny" (1993-01-18)
 No. 5 "A Heart That Knows You" (1993-04-12)
 No. 1 "God is in Control" (1994-02-21)
 No. 1 "Neither Will I" (1994-06-13)
 No. 2 "Watch and Pray" (1994-09-19)
 No. 4 "Seventy Years Ago" (1995-01-23)
 No. 1 "The Time is Now" (1995-04-24)
 No. 1 "Love's Been Following You" (1996-03)
 No. 4 "Faithful Friend" (with Steven Curtis Chapman) (1996-05-13)
 No. 1 "(I Am) Not Afraid Anymore" (1996-08-26)
 No. 1 "What Did He Die For" (1997-05)
 No. 1 "Run to You" (1999-10-25)
 No. 1 "I Choose Grace" (1999-10-25)

GMA Dove Awards 
1992: Praise and Worship Album of the Year, Sanctuary
1993: Female Vocalist of the Year
1994: Female Vocalist of the Year
1995: Female Vocalist of the Year
1995: Song of the Year, "God is in Control"
1996: Special Event Album of the Year – My Utmost For His Highest (various artists) (shared)
1997: Special Event Album of the Year – Tribute: The Songs of Andraé Crouch (various artists) (shared)
1998: Special Event Album of the Year – God With Us: A Celebration of Christmas Carols (various artists) (shared)
1999: Long Form Music Video of the Year – My Utmost for His Highest (various artists) (shared)
2002: Children's Music Album of the Year – Bedtime Prayers, Lullabies and Peaceful Worship

Source:

Books 
 Making a Christmas Memory (1990) (With Jeanie Price)
 In This Sanctuary: An Invitation to Worship the Savior (1992) (co-authored with Dr. Robert Webber)
 Celebrate the Gift of Jesus Every Day  (1993, 1994)
 Perennial: Meditations for the Seasons of Life (1998)
 Bedtime Prayers and Lullabies (2001)

References 

Living people
20th-century American singers
20th-century Christians
21st-century American singers
21st-century Christians
American women composers
American performers of Christian music
American women pop singers
Performers of contemporary Christian music
People from Fort Worth, Texas
People from Springdale, Arkansas
20th-century American composers
21st-century American women singers
20th-century American women singers
20th-century women composers
1958 births